Hong Kong Football Association Chairman's Cup 2005-06 is the 31st staging of the competition. The reserve teams of 6 First Division League clubs entered the competition.

Buler Rangers Reserve captured the champion by winning South China Reserve by 1-0 in the final.

Bracket
All times are Hong Kong Time (UTC+8).

Bracket

First round

Semi-finals

Final

Top goalscorers
 3 goals
  Au Wai Lun of South China Reserve

 2 goals
  Cheng Siu Wai of South China Reserve
  Lo Kwan Yee of Buler Rangers Reserve

 1 goal
  Chu Siu Kei of Xiangxue Sun Hei Reserve
  Leung Shing Kit of South China Reserve
  Luk Koon Pong of South China Reserve
  Cheung Wai Shing of South China Reserve
  Wong Siu Kwan of Kitchee Reserve
  Wong Chin Hung of Buler Rangers Reserve
  Fan Weijun of Buler Rangers Reserve
  Marcio Aanacleto of Buler Rangers Reserve
  Leung Chi Kui of Buler Rangers Reserve

See also
 HKFA Website 2005/2006 HKFA Chairman's Cup

2005-06
2006 domestic association football cups
Chair